Tumulty is a surname of Irish origin. Notable people with the surname include:

 Joseph Patrick Tumulty (1879–1954), American politician
 Karen Tumulty (born 1955), American journalist
 T. James Tumulty (1913–1981), American politician 
 Tom Tumulty (born 1973), American footballer

See also
 Tomalty, surname

 Michael Tumulty